Antonín Perič (30 September 1896 – 1980) was a Czech cyclist. He competed in two events at the 1924 Summer Olympics and two events at the 1928 Summer Olympics.

References

External links
 

1896 births
1980 deaths
Czech male cyclists
Olympic cyclists of Czechoslovakia
Cyclists at the 1924 Summer Olympics
Cyclists at the 1928 Summer Olympics
Sportspeople from Prague